Alton Ronald Waldon Jr. (born December 21, 1936) is an American politician and jurist from New York who served in the United States House of Representatives from 1986 to 1987 in addition to stints in the New York State Assembly from 1983 to 1986 and New York State Senate from 1991 to 2000, as a member of the Democratic Party.

Early life and education
Born in Lakeland, Florida, Waldon graduated from Boys High School in Brooklyn, New York in 1954 and went on to earn a B.S. from John Jay College in New York City in 1968 and a J.D. from New York Law School in  New York City in 1973.

Career

Military service and city career
Waldon served in the United States Army from 1956 to 1959. He was appointed as NYS Deputy Commissioner of Human Rights in 1975. He served as counsel in the Office of Mental Retardation and Developmental Disabilities.

New York State Assembly
He was a member of the New York State Assembly from 1983 to 1986, sitting in the 185th and 186th New York State Legislatures. Waldon was a delegate to the 1984 and 1988 Democratic National Conventions.

U.S. House of Representatives
In a special election to fill the New York's 6th congressional district seat in the U.S. House of Representatives vacated by the late Joseph P. Addabbo, Waldon was elected as a Democrat to the 99th United States Congress in 1986 and served from June 10, 1986, to January 3, 1987. Waldon became the first elected African-American member of Congress from Queens, New York.

In September 1986, Waldon ran for a full term, but was defeated in the Democratic primary—the real contest in this heavily Democratic, majority-black district—by Floyd H. Flake. Waldon was then appointed to the New York State Commission of Investigation.

New York State Senate
He was a member of the New York State Senate from 1991 to 1999, sitting in the 189th, 190th, 191st, 192nd and 193rd New York State Legislatures. In 1998, he tried to regain his congressional seat after Flake had resigned, but was defeated in the special election by state assemblyman Gregory Meeks.

Judicial career
In June 1999, he was nominated to the New York Court of Claims; and was confirmed by the State Senate in December.

See also
List of African-American United States representatives

Sources

References

External links

Living people
African-American members of the United States House of Representatives
John Jay College of Criminal Justice alumni
New York Law School alumni
Democratic Party members of the New York State Assembly
Democratic Party New York (state) state senators
1936 births
Democratic Party members of the United States House of Representatives from New York (state)
New York (state) state court judges
African-American state legislators in New York (state)
Boys High School (Brooklyn) alumni
21st-century African-American people
20th-century African-American people